Raisuan Airstrip, also known as Kendujhar Airstrip  is a public airstrip located at Gopinathpur in the Kendujhar district of Odisha. Nearest airport to this airstrip is Barbil Tonto Aerodrome in Barbil, Odisha.

References

Airports in Odisha
Kendujhar district
Airports with year of establishment missing